Mount Olds is a  mountain summit located in the Cayoosh Range of the Lillooet Ranges, in southwestern British Columbia, Canada. The mountain's name was officially adopted on June 21, 19796, by the Geographical Names Board of Canada. Precipitation runoff from the peak drains into tributaries of the Fraser River.

Climate

Based on the Köppen climate classification, Mount Olds is located in a subarctic climate zone of western North America. Most weather fronts originate in the Pacific Ocean, and travel east toward the Coast Mountains where they are forced upward by the range (Orographic lift), causing them to drop their moisture in the form of rain or snowfall. As a result, the Coast Mountains experience high precipitation, especially during the winter months in the form of snowfall. This climate supports the Place Glacier on the north slope of Mount Olds. Winter temperatures can drop below −20 °C with wind chill factors below −30 °C. The months July through September offer the most favorable weather for climbing Mount Olds.

See also

 Geography of British Columbia
 Geology of British Columbia

References

External links
 Weather forecast: Mount Olds

Olds
Pacific Ranges
Lillooet Land District